Rabak (ربك) is a city in south-eastern Sudan and the capital of the Sudanese state of White Nile. It is one of the major cities of Sudan, an industrial city in which are located several factories, such as the Nile Cement Company factory, the Kenana sugar factory, and the Assalaya sugar factory.

Geography

The city is located on the eastern bank of the White Nile, facing Kosti on the western bank. It lies some 362 meters above sea level. It is linked to the north of Sudan via the Khartoum–Rabak road; and it is linked by road eastward to Sennar and westward to Al-Ubayyid.

Climate

Demographics

History
Rabak was made the capital of the White Nile State in 1994.

Economy 
Rabak is one of major commercial cities in Sudan owing to its unique location in the country and its transportation links to the other major Sudanese states. In the city there is a cement processing company called the Nile Cement Company, which produced 50,200 tons in 2001 and 41,000 tons in 2002.  There is also a calcite mine nearby, besides Kenana sugar factory, Asallaia sugar factory, oil refineries, and other factories.

See also 
 Railway stations in Sudan

References 

Populated places in White Nile (state)
State capitals in Sudan